Skrwa may refer to:

  Skrwa Lewa, a river in Poland, left tributary of the Vistula
  Skrwa Prawa, a river in Poland, right tributary of the Vistula